The 1961 American Football League All-League Team was selected after the 1961 American Football League (AFL) season by five separate entities: current AFL players, the Associated Press (AP), United Press International (UPI), New York Daily News (NY), and The Sporting News (SN), and was published by The Sporting News. Each selector chose a first team at each position and second team at select positions.

Offense and defense

Other selections
Return specialist: Larry Garron, Boston Patriots (AFL-2)

References

All-League Players
American Football League All-League players